Ngawang Namgyal (later granted the honorific Zhabdrung Rinpoche, approximately "at whose feet one submits") (alternate spellings include Zhabdrung Ngawang Namgyel; 1594–1651) and known colloquially as The Bearded Lama, was a Tibetan Buddhist lama and the unifier of Bhutan as a nation-state. In addition to unifying the various warring fiefdoms for the first time in the 1630s, he also sought to create a distinct Bhutanese cultural identity separate from the Tibetan culture from which it was derived.

Birth and enthronement at Ralung
Zhabdrung Ngawang Namgyal was born at Ralung Monastery, Tibet as the son of the Drukpa lineage-holder Mipham Tenpa'i Nyima (1567–1619), and  Sönam Pelgyi Butri, daughter of the ruler of Kyishö in Tibet. On his father's side, Ngawang Namgyal descended from the family line of Tsangpa Gyare (1161–1211), the founder of the Drukpa Lineage.

In his youth, Ngawang Namgyal was enthroned as the eighteenth Drukpa or throne-holder and "hereditary prince" of the traditional Drukpa seat and estate of Ralung, and recognized there as the immediate reincarnation of the fourth Drukchen, the "Omniscient" Kunkhyen Pema Karpo (1527–1592).

His recognition and enthronement at Ralung as the Drukpa incarnation was, however, opposed by Lhatsewa Ngawang Zangpo, an influential follower of Drukpa Pema Karpo who promoted the recognition of a rival candidate—Gyalwang Pagsam Wangpo, an illegitimate son of the Chongje Depa, Ngawang Sönam Dragpa—as the Gyalwang Drukpa incarnation. Lhatsewa and supporters of the Chongje Depa conducted an enthronement ceremony of Pagsam Wangpo as the incarnation of Künkhyen Pema Karpo and Gyalwang Drukpa at Tashi Thongmen monastery. The Chongje Depa then persuaded the Tsang Desi (or Depa Tsangpa), the most powerful ruler in Tibet and patron of the rival Karma Kagyu sect, to support the recognition of Pagsam Wangpo as Gyalwang Drukpa and incarnation of Künkhyen Pema Karpo. By 1612, the Tsang Desi, Karma Phuntsok Namgyal, had gained control over all of Ü-Tsang.

For a time, Zhabdrung Ngawang Namgyal continued to live at the main Drukpa seat of Ralung, as—irrespective of who was entitled to be considered as the true incarnation of Kunkhyen Pema Karpo—Ngawang Namgyal was the main Drukpa hereditary lineage–holder and legitimate throne-holder at Ralung Monastery, the traditional seat of the Drukpa Lineage.

From Tibet to Bhutan

However, following a misunderstanding Zhabdrung Rinpoche and his party had with an important Karma Kagyu lama, Pawo Tsugla Gyatsho (1568–1630), the Tsang Desi demanded that compensation be paid, and that the sacred religious relics of Ralung—such as the Rangjung Kharsapani—should be surrendered to him so they could be given to the rival Gyalwang Drukpa incarnate, Gyalwa Pagsam Wangpo.

The Tsang Desi prepared to send covert armed guards to arrest Zhabdrung Rinpoche and enforce his demands. In 1616, facing arrest and following visions (in which it is said that the chief guardian deities of Bhutan offered him a home), Zhabdrung Ngawang Namgyal left Tibet to establish a new base in western Bhutan, founding Cheri Monastery at the head of Thimphu valley.

In 1629, he built Simtokha Dzong at the entrance to Thimphu valley; from this dzong, he could exert control over traffic between the powerful Paro valley to the west and Trongsa valley to the east.

Unification of Bhutan
Zhabdrung Rinpoche consolidated control over western Bhutan, subduing rivals belonging to the Lhapa, a branch of the Drikung Kagyu sect, which had built some of the original dzongs in Bhutan, including Punakha Dzong in 1637–1638. The Drukpa Kagyu, the Lhapa Kagyu, and the Nenyingpa had all controlled parts of western Bhutan since the twelfth century. Later, Zhabdrung Rinpoche would conquer and unify all of Bhutan, but would allow the ancient, Nyingma sect to continue in central and eastern Bhutan (today the Nyingmapa comprise approximately thirty percent of Bhutan's monks, even though they are privately funded while the Southern Drukpa Kagyu is supported as the established state religion of Bhutan).

In 1627, the first European visitors to Bhutan—the Portuguese Jesuits Estevao Cacella and João Cabral—found the Zhabdrung to be a compassionate and intelligent host, of high energy and fond of art and writing. In keeping with his position as a high lama, he was also meditative, and had just completed a three-year, silent retreat. The Zhabdrung was proud to have the Jesuits as guests of his court, and was reluctant to grant them permission to leave—offering to support their proselytizing efforts with manpower and church-building funds—but they pressed on to Tibet in search of the apostate church said to be isolated in the heart of central Asia (see Nestorian Stele).

Dual system of government

The Zhabdrung also established Bhutan's distinctive dual system of government under the Tsa Yig legal code, by which control of the country was shared between a spiritual leader (the Je Khenpo) to preside over the religious institutions, and an administrative leader (the Druk Desi) as head of secular affairs, a policy which exists, in modified form, to this day.

Relations with Ladakh
Sengge Namgyal, who ruled Ladakh from 1616 to 1623 and 1624 to 1642, was a devotee of the Ralung lineage of the Drukpa school. Like Bhutan, Ladakh then had differences with the new Gaden Photrang government of Tibet established by the fifth Dalai Lama, which attempted to annex Ladakh. 

An invitation was sent to Bhutan requesting that Zhabdrung Ngawang Namgyal become the state priest; as the Zhabdrung was occupied confronting an invasion from Tibet and consolidating the new Bhutanese state, he sent Choje Mukzinpa as his representative to the court of Ladakh. Several religious estates were offered to the Bhutanese in present-day Ladakh, Zangskar, and western Tibet (Ngari Korsum [mga' ris bskor gsum]), which was then part of Ladakh. One of them, Stakna Monastery or "Tiger's Nose," established by Choje Mukzinpa, became the main seat of the Southern Drukpa Kagyu tradition in Ladakh; this monastery still preserves artifacts and documents related to Bhutan, some of them said to have been gifted by Zhabdrung Ngawang Namgyal.

Death
Zhabdrung Ngawang Namgyal died in 1651, and power effectively passed to the penlops (local governors), instead of to a successor Zhabdrung. In order to forestall a dynastic struggle and a return to warlordism, the governors conspired to keep the death of the Zhabdrung secret for fifty-four years; during this time, they issued orders in his name, explaining that he was on an extended, silent retreat.

The anniversary of the death of the Zhabdrung is modernly celebrated as a Bhutanese national holiday, falling on the third month, tenth day of the Bhutanese calendar.

Notes

References

Sources

External links
Article: Shabdrung Ngawang Namgyal at the Dharma Dictionary.
Images: Shabdrung Ngawang Namgyal at HimalayanArt.org.
Image: 18 C painting of Shabdrung Ngawang Namgyal from Tango Monastery, Bhutan

1594 births
1651 deaths
Drukpa Kagyu lamas
Tibetan Buddhists from Tibet
Bhutanese Buddhist monks
17th century in Bhutan
16th-century Tibetan people
17th-century Tibetan people
Zhabdrung Rinpoches